The 1990 Asian Junior Women's Volleyball Championship was held in Chiang Mai, Thailand from ? – December to 10 December 1990

Results

Championship

Semifinals

|}

3rd place

|}

Final

|}

Final standing

References
Results (Archived 2014-10-17)

1990 in women's volleyball
Volleyball
International volleyball competitions hosted by Thailand
1990
1990 in youth sport
December 1990 sports events in Thailand